The greater ancient Near East (including Egypt) offers some of the oldest evidence of the existence of international relations, since it was there that states first developed (the city-states and empires of Mesopotamia, the Levant, and Egypt) around the 4th millennium B.C.E.  Almost 3000 years of the evolution of diplomatic relations are thus visible in sources from the ancient Near East.  However, because only certain periods are well documented within that timespan, there remain many gaps in the modern study of diplomacy in this era.

Evolution of diplomatic relations 
The diplomatic relations of the ancient Near East are known only in a fragmented fashion.  A limited number of texts allow us to understand relatively well the contemporary diplomatic practices of certain decades, spread out across more than two millennia and large geographical distances.  Long periods with little or no documentation are broken up by brief periods of abundant documentation.  However, this does not prevent us from understanding the broad threads and general trends in the evolution of international relations, for it follows the evolution of politics itself, which is known in general terms.

Ancient states period 
Diplomatic relations have existed for as long as human communities have been organized into political units, which precedes the period of this study.  The first Near Eastern states formed during the 4th millennium B.C.E., but international relations during this era are unknown due to a lack of documentation.

The first surviving documents on the subject of international relations appear towards the end of the Early Dynastic period of ancient Mesopotamia (2600-2340 B.C.E.).  They relate to the Sumerian city-state of Lagash.  Among them is the oldest known treaty, concluded between the king of Lagash (En-metena) and the king of Uruk.  However, the richest of the records concern the series of conflicts between Lagash and its neighbor Umma between 2600 and 2350 B.C.E.   The documents about these wars are primarily about the military aspects of the war, with little about the diplomatic side.  They display the constant rivalries between the cities of southern Mesopotamia.  These also appear in the epic stories of the kings of Uruk (Lugalbanda, Enmerkar, and Gilgamesh), which may describe real events.  They show the antagonisms pushing Lagash against its rivals, Kish and Aratta.  The city of Kish seemed to assert a hegemonic position at certain points— its king, Mesalim, intervened around 2600 to arbitrate in the conflict between Lagash and Umma, and the title of "King of Kish" was also assumed by kings of other cities as a sign of superiority.

The site which offers the most important diplomatic archives from this period are those from Ebla, in Syria.  The kings of Ebla had contacts with neighboring kings, notably the powerful sovereigns of Mari and Nagar, but also with the kings of more distant regions, like Kish in Mesopotamia and Hamazi in western Iran.  Excavations at Ebla have uncovered the oldest example of a written peace treaty, the treaty between Ebla and Abarsal, as well as proof of matrimonial alliances between the local kings and certain of their allies.

The first empires 

Gradually, certain states in southern Mesopotamia were able to exercise hegemony over their neighbors for longer and longer, like Uruk under Enshakushana and above all Umma under Lugal-zagesi.  This evolution was completed by Sargon of Akkad, who founded the first empire in 2340, comprising all of the Mesopotamian city-states, up to those of eastern Syria.  The diplomatic relations of this period are not well known.  There is a tablet which is inscribed with a peace treaty concluded between Naram-Sin of Akkad (Sargon's grandson) and the king of Awan, in southwest Iran, who was his vassal.  This complete hegemony endured until the second half of the 22nd century B.C.E., when the Akkadian Empire collapsed.  This vacuum was filled several decades later by the kings of the Third Dynasty of Ur, who founded in their turn the Neo-Sumerian Empire.  These sovereigns were in communication with their neighboring kingdoms, and they regularly received embassies, and sent their own messengers.  Their diplomatic service was controlled by a dignitary named SUKKAL.MAH.  They combined their military expeditions onto the Iranian plateau with matrimonial politics, marrying their daughters to the kings of the regions (Anshan, Zabshali) in order to win their loyalty and solidify their own legitimacy.  However, their empire ended in disintegration, and began a long period without a hegemonic empire, under the Amorite dynasties.

The second millennium: the balance of powers 

The 2nd millennium was a period during which a relative power equilibrium was reached— no kingdom was able to exert power over its neighbors in a durable fashion.  This allowed the gradual formation of more and more powerful and stable states, which dominated the international stage, and controlled a certain number of vassals, which tended to reduce over time.  These vassals were the object of many rivalries between the dominant kingdoms, which sometimes resulted in overt conflict.  

The first half of the millennium was the era of the Amorite Kingdoms (2004-1595 B.C.E.), which formed a kind of koiné of political practices, similar from the Mediterranean to the Zagros foothills.  Mesopotamia and Syria were dominated successively by many kingdoms— first by Isin and Larsa, who took the succession of Ur, but finally by Babylon, which imposed its hegemony under Hammurabi (1792-1750) and his successors, just as Elam failed to impose its power over Mesopotamia.  In Syria, the dominant kingdom was that of Yamkhad (Aleppo), which profited from the dissipation of its neighbors Mari and Qatna (its greatest rival) over the course of the 18th and 17th centuries.  The diplomatic practices of this era were documented mainly by the exceptional royal archives of Mari, dating from the first half of the 18th century (diplomatic correspondence, political accords, historical records), but also supplemented by the more minor archives of Tell Leilan, Tell Rimah, Kültepe, and others.  

The end of the Amorite period was marked by the destruction of its two great kingdoms by the Hittites, who had reunited the kingdoms of eastern Anatolia in the last decades of the 17th century.  At the same time, the Hurrians began to found increasingly powerful political entities, culminating in the formation of the kingdom of Mitanni.  To these two were added Egypt.  After the 18th dynasty had driven out the Hyksos, they invaded several decades later the Levant, expanding their empire their, bordering Mitanni.  This marked a new era, with larger, more powerful, and more culturally diverse kingdoms.  Most of the ancient Amorite kingdoms became vassals of the new rulers, with the exception of Babylon, which remained an important power under the Kassites (1595-1155).  The sovereigns of these dominant kingdoms were considered as "great kings", equal among each other.  Beginning in the 14th century, Assyria replaced Mitanni in this group.  Elam could also be considered one of the great kingdoms of this period, at least in the 13th and 12th centuries.  The diplomatic practices of this period are known thanks to several collections of exceptional importance: those of Hattusa, the Hittite capital (letters, diplomatic accords, historical chronicles), the letters of Amarna, in Egypt (international correspondence of the pharaohs Amenhotep III and Akhenaton), and the royal archives of Ugarit, a minor Syrian kingdom controlled first by Egypt and later by the Hittites.  It is during this period that international relations are documented by the most abundant and geographically diverse sources.

The empires of the first millennium 

The period of the "great kings" ended around 1200, with the arrival of great political changes, notably the successive migrations of the Sea Peoples and the Arameans, the collapse of the dominant kingdoms' power, and the creation of many smaller kingdoms in Syria, the Levant, and Anatolia, which were not under the control of any larger power.  This transformation is known as the Late Bronze Age Collapse.  The Books of the Prophets of the Hebrew Bible allow us to observe the relations of two of these states (Israel and Judea) with their neighbors.  

Assyria was the only one of these great kingdoms to preserve its power and political stability enough to rebuild an empire starting at the end of the 10th century.  In a little more than two centuries, Assyria imposed its control over most of the Near Eastern kingdoms around it.  Only Babylon, Urartu, Elam, and Egypt were able to resist their domination, but they were eventually conquered as well.  This period marked the beginning of great hegemonic empires in the Middle East.  Because of this, Assyria did not seek to develop very strong diplomatic relations, opting instead to dominate its neighbors.  Its relations with other kingdoms were mostly unequal.  The foreign relations of the Assyrians, above all those with their vassals, are known from the archives of the Assyrian capitals (mainly Nineveh), complemented by sources from outside the core of the empire (notably the Hebrew Bible).  

Between 614 and 609, Assyria was destroyed by an alliance between the Babylonians and the Medes, but the empire of the former did not last even a full century, since their real power did not compare with that of the Medes— the Achaemenid Persians.  Under the leadership of Cyrus II, Cambyses, and Darius, they created a lasting empire, which outlasted the Assyrian and Babylonian empires.  They did not tolerate any kingdom which purported to be their equal.  This empire fell to the invasion of Alexander the Great between 333 and 330, who proved incapable of utilizing the Achaemenid heritage to his advantage, and at his death in 323 his generals divided up the empire.  This was the beginning of the Hellenistic period, during which the Mediterranean and the Middle East were divided between several rival great kingdoms.

Diplomatic practices 
The different practices utilized in diplomatic relations in the ancient Near East are essentially known through the royal archives of the 2nd millennium, coming largely from four archaeological sites (Mari, Hattusa, Tell el-Amarna, and Ugarit), complemented by less numerous sources from the preceding millennium (Lagash, Ebla) and the following (Nineveh, Hebrew Bible).  There seems to be a relative homogeneity and continuity in practices.  However, this article mainly concerns the 2nd millennium, because of the available sources and because the international context at that time was more conducive to developments in international relations.

One big family 
The kings of the 2nd millennium resembled one large family.  The suzerains were the "fathers" (In Akkadian, abu(m)) of their vassals, who were called their "sons" (māru(m)).  Between sovereigns of equal rank (great kings, or else vassals of the same king or of a king of equal rank), rulers were considered "brothers" (ahu(m)).  The relationship between suzerain and vassal was also marked by the usage of the terms "master" and "servant" (bēlu(m) et (w)ardu(m)).  The familial metaphor reflects the nature of the relationships, or at least the ideal relationships, between these sovereigns— they must have affection for one another, a father must protect his son, but on the other hand the latter must obey, respect, remain loyal, and offer a regular tribute.  Equals must work to ensure they are always on equal footing, with reciprocity in their relations, with the principle of gift and counter-gift.  Gradually, kings who didn't have suzerains (besides the gods) acquired a place apart, and in the second half of the second millennium they began to take the title of "great king" (šarru rābu), and formed a sort of very close "club" (to use the expression of H. Tadmor, reused by M. LIverani), which determined who could enter, as a function of their political successes.  It was this that allowed Assur-uballit I of Assyria to take the place of Mitanni, after defeating them, but at the same place not Tarundaradu of Arzawa (in eastern Anatolia), who did not defeat the Hittites.  Each king thus sought relations with their peers.

The agents of diplomacy: the messengers 
The agents who conducted relations between royal courts were the messengers (Akkadian mār šipri(m)), empowered by the royal palaces.  Sometimes they called on merchants traveling on their own business, or perhaps dignitaries of the realm, often accompanied by other dignitaries or by servants.  These messengers were the key actors in diplomacy: they carried messages, gifts sent by their king, but were also empowered to negotiate potential political accords or future marriages between royal courts.  Their autonomy varied according to circumstances— some were merely letter-carriers, but other were charged with a mission and could negotiate; other had the full power of their king by proxy (often those close to the king).  It all depended on the degree of confidence which they inspired in their master.  

These messengers traveled on foot, on donkeys, on chariots, or even ships.  They were welcomed upon their arrival in their destination country, and were lodged in designated buildings by their hosts, rarely in their palace.  Their daily needs were paid for.  They could also have audiences before the sovereign, who received them, and deliver him presents on behalf of their sovereign.  These audiences were public, and foreign envoys could attend them (even if they were enemies of those being given an audience).  They frequently had to adjust diplomatic protocol between different hosts, knowing that the stakes were very high, with very serious consequences.  The term of the visit was fixed by the host: certain messengers might have stayed for many months, or even one or two years, as in certain cases known from the letters of Amarna.  A returning messenger was generally accompanied by a messenger of the host country, to ensure safe passage and to vouch for the information they carried.  

There were no permanent ambassadors present in foreign courts, but certain dignitaries could specialize in relations with a specific court where they had residences and connections.  An example of this was the Egyptian Mane, who traveled many times to the court of the Mitanni king Tushratta, in the era of Amarna.  There were also specialists in international relations.  These messengers in theory had an immunity, and when one was subjected to difficulties, or killed at the direction of the sovereign, there would be an outcry from the other kings.  Two examples of laissez-passer reserved for these messengers have been found, at Mari and at Tell el-Amarna.  Courts where foreign messengers passed without being received in audience were still obliged to house them: at Mari, they were referred to as being messengers "in passage" (ētiqum).

Royal Correspondence  

In order to allow the existence of proper relations between kings, without interpretive bias, written diplomatic tablets were required, of which many examples have been found at numerous archaeological sites.  These messages were generally written in Babylonian Akkadian, the international language dating from the beginning of the 2nd millennium B.C.E., and begin in a very simple manner, with an introductory address naming the sender and the recipient (according to the common Akkadian formula ana X qibī-ma umma Y-ma: "to X say: ... thus spoke Y".  During the second half of the 2nd millennium, these diplomatic messages contained very elaborate greetings, in which a great king would wish the happiness and prosperity of one of his peers and his house, or if he was a vassal, would reiterate the extent to which he submitted to him (for example, following the formula "I prostrate myself at your feet seven times and seven times more").

Exchange of gifts 

Royal envoys going to foreign courts were often charged with delivering presents to their hosts.  A sovereign could extract a tribute from his vassal, regularly but also at a whim.  These relations were thus asymmetric.  But in the case of relations between two equals, the relationship had to be symmetrical: a present received had to be reciprocated by a present of the same value.  It was a system of gifts and contra-gifts (šūbultum and šūrubtum in the Amorite period).  This paradigm is summarized in a letter discovered at Mari, in which the king of Qatna complains to his counterpart in Ekallatum, because the latter had not sent him gifts of the same value as those which he had sent previously.  The king of Qatna explains that this type of protest must not normally be made (the rules being unspoken etiquette), but that in this case he was almost inclined to take it as an affront, and that other sovereigns, upon learning of the incident, would think that he had come away from the exchange weaker than before.  It was thus an affair of prestige, which was taken very seriously.  In the era of Amarna, quarrels over the sending of gifts were common.

The goods exchanged often mirrored those one found in international commerce: Elam in the Amorrite period thus made presents of tin from the mines of the Iranian Plateau, as the king of Egypt in the Amarna era sent gold from Nubia, and that of Alashiya (without a doubt Cyprus) offered copper.  These prized metals were the object of veritable negotiations in the Amarna letters, and kings negotiated fiercely over what was being sent, which seems to indicate a certain dependence with regard to these exchanges.  Manufactured products— vases, jewels, jewelry, thrones, or chariots— were also found.  Some believe that it amounted to disguised commerce, the contra-gift being the "price" paid for the gift, but this is debatable to the extent to which the desire for reciprocity remained present and dominant in these negotiations.  The economic and symbolic aspects remain difficult to dissociate.  Exchanges of diplomatic presents could concern other objects, notably artisanal works, but also exotic animals, or of course fine horses.

In specific cases, one could also send people to other courts.  A vassal could be summoned to send servants to the court of his suzerain as tribute.  Ramses II sent one of his doctors to the Hittite court of Hattusili III.  In the era of Amarna, Tushratta of Mitanni sent the statue of the goddess Ishtar from Nineveh to Egypt, possibly to appease the pharaoh Amenhotep III.  It seems thus that this consisted of services rendered between allied courts (allied by dynastic marriages), and not exchanges following the gift/contra-gift principle.

Alliances and International Treaties 

At particular times, states could conclude diplomatic accords, of which the names varied (for example, in Akkadian niš ili(m), riksu(m), māmītu(m), or adê in the neo-Assyrian era; lingaiš- or išhiul- in Hittite; bêrit in Hebrew).  These generally followed periods of war, and were intended to end them.  These treaties were not necessarily written down, but written treaties appeared relatively early— the earliest known example dates to the 24th century, and concerns the cities of Ebla and Abarsal, the latter of which involved Naram-Sin of Akkad and an Elamite king.  In the Amorrite period, many tablets detailing the protocols of oaths of alliance between kings were unearthed at Mari, Tell Leilan, and Kültepe, or are of unknown provenance (accords between Shadlash and Nerebtum and Eshnunna, Larsa and Uruk).  And the texts of treaties date to the following period, found at Alalakh, Ugarit, and above all Hattusa, the Hittite capital, the treaty between Hittite king Hattusili III and Egyptian king Ramses II being additionally known by its Egyptian copy inscribed in hieroglyphs, the only time copies of a treaty have been found at sites of both parties.  Concerning the neo-Assyrian period, international treaties were exhumed at Nineveh; another is linked by an Aramaic inscription to Sfire.  

 

.

A written version was not necessarily recorded at the conclusion of a diplomatic accord.  What mattered was the oath taken by witness of the gods, engaging each of the parties.  "Treaties" from the Amorrite period are actually protocols for these oaths; they were often reinforced by rituals: a sacrifice following a banquet if both parties could be present for the conclusion of the accord, or a ritual called "throat touching" (lipit napištim) if it was impossible to meet in person.  No ritual of this type is known from other periods.  The Hittites paid more attention to the tablets on which treaties were recorded; the clauses of certain treaties stipulated that many copies were to be produced, and stored in specified locations, chiefly the temples of the gods bearing witness to the accord.  They also recorded treaties on metal tablets, a single example of which has been found in Hattusa.  Treaties in general seem to have concerned only the parties themselves, and not their descendants, who would have to renew the accord upon ascending to the throne.  The Hittites, though, seem to have considered treaties to engage the parties' descendants as well.

The texts of treaties generally consisted of: presentation of the parties concerned, the clauses of the accord, the list of divinities guaranteeing the accord, and eventually the curses which would afflict those who broke the contract.  The Hittites also included a section detailing the historical situation which led to the treaty's existence.  Clauses usually concerned the conditions of peace between parties (the circulation of people between kingdoms, the repatriation of prisoners, and eventually the expulsion of political refugees), or even an alliance (following the formula "to be friends with the friends and enemies with the enemies" of the other).  The hierarchy of kings was respected in the clauses: they were symmetrical if they concerned two rulers of equal rank, but unequal if they concerned a suzerain and his vassal.  The treaties of vassalhood (above all attested in the Hittite and Assyrian spheres) regulated the conditions of the submission of one kingdom to another: the vassal could not maintain an independent foreign policy, had to pay a tribute, lend military aid to the suzerain when needed, and sometimes to allow the suzerain's garrisons on their soil.  In the case of the treaties passed by the merchant city of Assur in the 19th century, clauses relating to economic activities are found (taxation, security of merchants).

Matrimonial Alliances 

Dynastic marriages were a very common diplomatic practice in the history of the ancient Near East, attested from the archives of Ebla in the archaic period, but above all documented in the 2nd millennium.  It was a means of creating or deepening links between two royal families.  Sovereigns were polygamous, so they could contract marriages with many daughters or sisters of other kings.  It was always the woman who left her court to join that of her fiancé.  Marriages could be between kingdoms of the same rank, or between those of different ranks, when a suzerain promised a woman to a vassal, or even a vassal promised a woman to a suzerain.  They would thus join the harem of their new spouse.  Great kings generally ensured that their daughters would play main roles at the courts they went to, and often imposed that they would be the principal wife so that they could eventually play a political role.  The Hebrew Bible presents the case of Jezabel, daughter of the king of Tyre, as an examples of this; she married King Ahab of Judea and exercised great influence over him.  But such a success was not systematic, and a study of the destinies of the daughters of king Zimri-Lim of Mari, who were married to daughters of other Syrian Amorrite kings, shows that some fared better than others.  In principle, every sovereign must play the game of matrimonial exchanges, but the Egyptian kings of the recent Bronze age make an exception.  They refused to marry their daughters to foreign kings, even their equals, but still consented to marry foreign princesses themselves; they did not respect the rules of parity in this case.

The process of arranging dynastic marriages is known thanks to many well-documented records, found at Mari, Tell el-Amarna, and Hattusa (in the case of marriages between kingdoms of equal rank. First, the marriage had to be negotiated, in particular the choice of spouse.  The initiative was generally taken by the future father-in-law, but sometimes by the future husband.  Negotiations were conducted by correspondence, and through the most trusted messenger/ambassadors available.  In the case of the marriage between Ramses II and the daughter of Hattusili III, the Hittite queen Puduhepa negotiated directly with the Egyptian queen.  But generally, it was the business of men.  Envoys had to negotiate the dowry, but also to see the bride and assure the groom's family that she was beautiful, which was the main quality sought after in her.  The dowry (nidditum in paleo-Babylonian, given by the bride's family to the groom's) was the object of negotiations which could be fierce, and called equally for a counter-dowry (terhatum in paleo-Babylonian, given by the groom's family to the bride's).  Lists of dowries and counter-dowries have been exhumed at Mari and Tell el-Amarna.  Once the arrangements had been made, the princess left her home court for good in order to integrate into her husband's.  She made the journey with her entourage, representatives of her home court, and those of her fiancé's court.  The marital ceremony was generally held after she arrived.  She could then keep in contact with her family through letters, or through envoys sent by them.  Her family would have anxiously awaited news that she bore children (preferably male) for her husband.

See also 
Ebla
Mari, Syria
Amarna letters

References

General Bibliography 
B. Lafont, "Diplomatie," in Dictionnaire de la civilisation mésopotamienne, ed. F. Joannès, Paris, 2001, 235-239.

B. Lafont, "International Relations in the Ancient Near East: The Birth of a Complete Diplomatic System," in Diplomacy and Statecraft 12, 2001, 39-60.

A.H. Podany, Brotherhood of Kings: How International Relations Shaped the Ancient Near East, New York, 2010.

D. Charpin, "Tu es de mon sang! Les alliances dans le Proche-Orient ancien, Les Belles Lettres - Collège de France, Paris, 2019.

Ancient Near East